The Women's Points Race event at the 2010 South American Games was held on March 21.

Medalists

Results

Distance: 80 laps (20 km) with 8 sprint
Elapsed time: 29:28.614
Average Speed: 40.709 km/h

References
Report

Points W
Women's points race